Fort Shafter, in Honolulu CDP, City and County of Honolulu, Hawai‘i, is the headquarters of the United States Army Pacific, which commands most Army forces in the Asia-Pacific region with the exception of Korea. Geographically, Fort Shafter extends up the interfluve (ridgeline) between Kalihi and Moanalua valleys, as well as onto the coastal plain (as Shafter Flats) at Māpunapuna. A portion of the area is also known as the Palm Circle Historic District; it is listed on the National Register of Historic Places and has been further designated as a U.S. National Historic Landmark.  It is also known as Palm Circle or 100 Area.

History
Fort Shafter is the oldest military base on Oahu and celebrated its 100th birthday on June 22, 2007.

Fort Shafter has been home to the senior Army headquarters in Hawaii for a century. Construction began in 1905 on the ahupua'a of Kahauiki, former Hawaiian crown lands that were ceded to the United States government after annexation. When the post opened in 1907, it was named for Major General William Rufus Shafter (1835–1906), who led the United States expedition to Cuba in 1898.

Palm Circle was laid out as a cantonment for an infantry battalion. The barracks and officers' quarters were arranged around a parade field ringed by royal palms. The first unit stationed at the new post was the 2d Battalion, 20th Infantry Regiment.

Fort Shafter gradually spread out from Palm Circle. Tripler General Hospital once stood where the highway intersection is today (the hospital moved to its present location in 1948). In 1914, a regimental-sized cantonment area was constructed (near Richardson Theater). The Hawaiian Ordnance Depot was built in 1917 as a separate post (near today's post exchange). In 1921, the Hawaiian Department moved to Fort Shafter from downtown Honolulu. Finally, a new area was constructed in 1940 for Signal Corps elements. 

War came to Fort Shafter on December 7, 1941, where the Hawaiian Department commander, Lieutenant General Walter C. Short, occupied Quarters 5. One soldier, Corporal Arthur A. Favreau, 64th Coast Artillery (Anti-Aircraft), was killed on post by an errant Navy shell. Fort Shafter became a busy headquarters and the barracks on Palm Circle were converted to offices. The major headquarters was named successively U.S. Army Forces, Central Pacific Area (1943–44); U.S. Army Forces, Pacific Ocean Areas (1944–45); and U.S. Army Forces, Middle Pacific (1945–47). In 1944, the Army Corps of Engineers erected the "Pineapple Pentagon" (buildings T-100, T-101, and T-102) in just 49 days. Two large fishponds were filled in to form Shafter Flats.

For most of the time since the Second World War, Fort Shafter has remained the senior Army headquarters for the Asia-Pacific region. In 1947, the headquarters was renamed U.S. Army, Pacific. The post continued to adapt to meet the Army's evolving requirements. In the early 1960s it was split in two by the new Moanalua Freeway. In 1974, when the headquarters was eliminated, Fort Shafter became home to U.S. Army Support Command, Hawaii, and the U.S. Army Corps of Engineers, Pacific Ocean Division (relocated from Fort Armstrong, (Hawaii)). In 1979, the Army established U.S. Army Western Command, which was renamed U.S. Army, Pacific in 1990. In 1983, the Army conveyed to the State of Hawaii  of undeveloped land on the northern end of post. Today Fort Shafter remains the focal point for command, control, and support of Army forces in the Asia-Pacific region; it includes an underground command center beneath Palm Circle.

References

External links

 US Army Garrison - Hawaii
 United States Army Pacific
 
 
 

Government buildings completed in 1907
Buildings and structures in Honolulu
Shafter
Shafter
Historic American Buildings Survey in Hawaii
Historic American Landscapes Survey in Hawaii
1907 establishments in Hawaii